|}

The Fred Winter Juvenile Novices' Handicap Hurdle, known for sponsorship purposes as the Boodles Juvenile Handicap Hurdle, is a Premier Handicap National Hunt hurdle race in Great Britain which is open to horses aged four years. It is run on the Old Course at Cheltenham over a distance of about 2 miles and ½ furlong (2 miles and 87 yards, or 3,298 metres), and during its running there are eight hurdles to be jumped. It is a handicap race for juvenile novice hurdlers, and it is scheduled to take place each year during the Cheltenham Festival in March.

The event is named in memory of Fred Winter (1926–2004), who was successful as both a jockey and a trainer in National Hunt racing. Winter's record at the Cheltenham Festival included seventeen victories as a jockey, and twenty-eight as a trainer.

The Fred Winter Juvenile Hurdle was one of several new races introduced at the Festival when a fourth day was added to the meeting in 2005. It was initially classed at Listed level, and it was promoted to Grade 3 status in 2009. The race was re-classified as a Premier Handicap from the 2023 running when Grade 3 status was renamed by the British Horseracing Authority.

Records
Leading jockey (2 wins):
 Mark Walsh - Aramax (2020), Brazil (2022)

Leading trainer (4 wins):
 Gordon Elliott - Flaxen Flare (2013), Veneer of Charm (2018), Aramax (2020), Jazzy Matty (2023)

Winners
 Weights given in stones and pounds.

See also
 Horse racing in Great Britain
 List of British National Hunt races

References

 Racing Post:

 pedigreequery.com – Fred Winter Juvenile Novices' Hurdle – Cheltenham.
 racenewsonline.co.uk – Racenews Archive (21 February 2008).

National Hunt races in Great Britain
Cheltenham Racecourse
National Hunt hurdle races
Recurring sporting events established in 2005
2005 establishments in England